The Peters Hill Limestone or Peters Hill Formation is a geologic formation in Jamaica. It preserves fossils such as rudists, echinoids and corals from the Santonian stage of the Cretaceous Period.

See also 
 List of fossiliferous stratigraphic units in Jamaica

References

Further reading 
 L. J. Chubb. 1971. Rudists of Jamaica. Palaeontographica Americana 7(45):161-257

Geologic formations of Jamaica
Cretaceous Jamaica
Santonian Stage
Limestone formations
Shallow marine deposits
Formations